Calephelis perditalis,  also known as the rounded metalmark or lost metalmark, is a species of butterfly in the family Riodinidae. It is found in Texas in the United States and Mexico, south to Venezuela. The species was first described by William Barnes and James Halliday McDunnough in 1918.

The wingspan is 18–24 mm. The upperside of the wings is brown with indistinctly checkered fringes. There may be a dark median band. Adults feed on flower nectar, including the nectar of Chromolaena odorata.

The larvae feed on Chromolaena odorata and Eupatorium glabratum.

Subspecies
Calephelis perditalis perditalis - Mexico, southern Texas
Calephelis perditalis donahuei McAlpine, 1971 - Mexico

References

External links

Riodinidae
Butterflies described in 1918
Butterflies of North America
Riodinidae of South America